The collusion of government officials and entrepreneurs, or government–commercial corruption,  official-business collusion,  most generally translated as government-business collusion, is a term with a negative connotation  that generally refers to the government or individual officials who show favoritism and dereliction of duty by transferring benefits to individual enterprises in the formulation or implementation of policies, which cannot be directly equated with corruption because there is no substantial monetary transaction, but the government favors public power over certain businesspeople or consortiums and the political system is tilted toward interest groups. In short, it means collusion between government and business to transferring interests.

Related studies

References 

Corruption
Political corruption